Free and Easy is a 2016 comedy film directed by Chinese filmmaker Geng Jun. It was screened at the Ullens Center for Contemporary Art (UCCA) in Beijing on 5 November 2016.  It was also screened in the World Cinema Dramatic Competition section of the 2017 Sundance Film Festival.

Cast
 Xu Gang
 Zhang Zhiyong
 Xue Baohe
 Gu Benbin
 Zhang Xun
 Yuan Liguo

Reception

Critical reception
On review aggregator website Rotten Tomatoes, the film holds an approval rating of 100% based on 6 reviews, and an average rating of 6.5/10.

Awards and nominations

References

External links
 

2016 films
2016 comedy films
Hong Kong comedy films
2010s Mandarin-language films
2010s Hong Kong films